The Nieuport-Delage NiD 30 was a French airliner which entered service in 1920. It was a reverse-stagger biplane design with an enclosed cabin that seated four passengers and an open cockpit for the pilot. Provision was also made for a wireless transmitter, receiver, and operator. Seven examples were operated by Compagnie générale transaérienne on its Paris–London route on twice-daily return services.

Following the loss of one of these machines in thick fog over the Channel on 27 April 1920, the remaining NiD-30s were fitted with an early audible guidance system. However, after a number of further accidents, these were withdrawn from service in February 1921.

A larger, six-passenger variant with longer overhung top wings was developed as the NiD 30T2 and displayed at the 1921 Salon de l'Aéronautique, but this was not produced when testing revealed problems with the design.

Variants
 NiD 30T1 - four-passenger production version with Sunbeam Matabele engine (7 built)
 NiD 30T2 - six-passenger version with Darracq 12A engine (1 built)

Operators
 
 Compagnie générale transaérienne

Specifications (NiD 30T1)

See also

Notes

References

 
 
 
 
 

1910s French airliners
 030
Biplanes with negative stagger
Single-engined tractor aircraft
Aircraft first flown in 1919